English suffixes